Manuel Pérez (born 19 November 1939) is a Cuban film director and screenwriter. He has directed seven films since 1961. His 1973 film The Man from Maisinicu was entered into the 8th Moscow International Film Festival where it won a Special Mention. His 1977 film Río Negro was entered into the 10th Moscow International Film Festival where it won the Special Prize.

Selected filmography
 The Man from Maisinicu (1973)
 Río Negro (1977)
 Che Guevara: Where You'd Never Imagine Him (2004)

References

External links

1939 births
Living people
Cuban film directors
Cuban screenwriters
Cuban male writers
Male screenwriters
People from Havana